Jan Dalecký (born March 10, 1990) is a Czech professional ice hockey player. He played with HC Kladno in the Czech Extraliga during the 2010–11 Czech Extraliga season.

References

External links

1990 births
Czech ice hockey forwards
Rytíři Kladno players
Living people
Competitors at the 2015 Winter Universiade
Sportspeople from Kladno
Swift Current Broncos players
HC Berounští Medvědi players
Herning Blue Fox players
IHC Písek players
HK Dukla Trenčín players
Czech expatriate ice hockey players in Canada
Czech expatriate ice hockey players in Slovakia
Czech expatriate sportspeople in Denmark
Czech expatriate sportspeople in Hungary
Expatriate ice hockey players in Hungary
Expatriate ice hockey players in Denmark
Debreceni EAC (ice hockey) players